Joseph Sewell (active 1931–33) was a footballer who played at outside right in the Football League for Darlington.

Sewell, who played as an amateur, made his debut in January 1932 in a 3–1 defeat at Chester in the Third Division North. He played into the 1932–33 season, and finished his Darlington career with 11 League appearances. He also played for Crook Town.

Sewell married Jenny Henderson at South Hetton, County Durham, in 1933.

References

Year of birth missing
Year of death missing
Place of birth missing
Association football outside forwards
Crook Town A.F.C. players
Darlington F.C. players
English Football League players
Place of death missing
English footballers